The Salon des Tuileries was an annual art exhibition for painting and sculpture, created June 14, 1923, co-founded by painters Albert Besnard and Bessie Davidson, sculptor Antoine Bourdelle, architect Auguste Perret, and others.

The first year's exhibition was conducted in former barracks at the Porte Maillot of the city gates of Paris, near the Bois de Boulogne in a "Palais du Bois"  hastily constructed by the Perret brothers.  Its location varied afterwards.  The Salon, together with the 1884 Société des Artistes Indépendants, the 1903 Salon d'Automne and others, was organized in opposition to the Academy's official Salon system.  Annual exhibitions continued at least into the 1950s.

Participating artists 

Participating artists included:

 Edith Auerbach
 Edmond Aman-Jean
 Marcelle Bergerol
 Jules Cavaillès
 Margaret Cossaceanu
 Marguerite Crissay
 Mildred Crooks
 Joseph Csaky
 Alice Dannenberg
 Charles Despiau
 Louis Dewis
 Jean Dries
 Raoul Dufy
 Fan Tchunpi
 Roger de La Fresnaye
 Frederick Carl Frieseke
 Othon Friesz
 Alberto Giacometti
 Albert Gleizes
 Natalia Goncharova
 Louise Janin
 Adolph Gottlieb
 Moïse Kisling
 Sonia Lewitska
 Jean Metzinger
 Henri Ottmann
 Olga Sacharoff
 Martha Stettler
 Léopold Survage
 Henriette Tirman
 Maurice de Vlaminck
 Ossip Zadkine

Sources

External links
 Salon des Tuileries, Le Palais de Bois, 1928 catalogue
 Gazette des Sept Arts, dir. Canudo, n. 8, Numéro consacré au premier Salon des Tuileries, 20 May 1923

French artist groups and collectives
Recurring events established in 1923
Art exhibitions in France
Painting in Paris